The following is a list of churches in Portugal by district or autonomous region.

Aveiro District

Capela de Nossa Senhora do Desterro (Arada) (pt)
Capela do Senhor do Calvário (pt)
Cathedral of Aveiro
Church of São João Evangelista
Igreja Matriz de Arrifana (pt)
Igreja Matriz de Santa Marinha de Cortegaça (pt)
Igreja Matriz de São Cristóvão (pt)
Igreja Paroquial de São Martinho do Bispo (pt)
Igreja Paroquial de Válega (pt also known as Igreja matriz de Santa Maria de Válega)
Igreja de Trofa
Igreja Matriz de Belazaima do Chão
Igreja da Misericórdia de Santa Maria da Feira (pt)
Igreja de Roge (pt)
Igreja de São Martinho (Argoncilhe) (pt)
Igreja de São Tiago de Silvalde (pt)

Azores

Church of the Jesuit College (Ponta Delgada)
Church of Nossa Senhora do Bom Despacho
Church of Nossa Senhora dos Milagres (Corvo)
Church of Nossa Senhora do Rosário (Calheta)
Church of Santa Bárbara (Horta)
Church of Santa Bárbara (Vila do Porto)
Church of Santa Catarina (Calheta)
Church of São Mateus da Calheta
Church of São Mateus da Calheta (Old)
Sé Cathedral of Angra do Heroísmo

Beja District

Basílica Real de Castro Verde (pt)
Basílica Real de Nossa Senhora da Conceição de Castro Verde (pt)
Igreja de São Vicente (Cuba) (pt)
Igreja Matriz de Santa Maria da Feira (pt)
Igreja Matriz de São Vicente de Cuba (pt)
Igreja de Nossa Senhora da Conceição (Santa Maria da Feira)
Igreja de Nossa Senhora da Estrela (pt)
Igreja de Nossa Senhora dos Prazeres de Beja (pt)
Igreja Matriz de Vila de Frades (pt)
Igreja de São Miguel (Póvoa de São Miguel) (pt)
Igreja de Nossa Senhora da Anunciação 
Igreja Paroquial de Safara (pt)
Igreja de Santa Maria (Serpa) 
Igreja Paroquial de Santo Aleixo da Restauração
Igreja de São João Batista (Moura) (pt)

Braga District

Bom Jesus do Monte 
Braga Cathedral 
Capela da Senhora da Luz (pt)
Carmo Church (Braga)
Chapel of São Frutuoso
Church of Fontarcada
Church of São Miguel do Castelo
Coimbras Chapel
Congregados Basilica
Falperra Church
Holy Cross Church, Braga
Igreja de Fontarcada
Igreja de Nossa Senhora da Oliveira (Guimarães)
Igreja de Santa Eulália do Mosteiro de Arnoso
Igreja de Santa Maria de Abade de Neiva
Igreja de São Romão de Arões
Igreja de Vilar de Frades
Igreja do Bom Jesus (pt)
Igreja Matriz de Barcelos
Igreja Matriz de São Martinho de Candoso
Igreja Paroquial de Creixomil (pt)
Igreja Paroquial de S. Jorge de Abadim (pt)
Igreja Paroquial de Vermoim (pt)
Igreja de Santiago de Antas (pt)
Igreja de São Miguel do Castelo 
Igreja de São Romão de Arões
Misericórdia Church
Monastery of São Martinho de Tibães
Mosteiro de Landim (pt)
Pópulo Church
Saint Eulália Church
Sameiro Sanctuary
Santuário de Nossa Senhora do Pilar (pt)
Santuário de Nossa Senhora da Abadia (pt)
Santuário de Nossa Senhora do Bom Despacho (pt)
Santuário de Nossa Senhora do Porto de Ave (pt)
São Bento da Porta Aberta (pt)
St Paul's Church, Braga
St Vincent's Church, Braga

Bragança District

Castelo Branco District

Coimbra District

Capela de São Miguel (Capela da Universidade de Coimbra)
Igreja da Graça
Igreja de Santiago
Monastery of Santa Clara-a-Nova
Monastery of Santa Clara-a-Velha
Monastery of Santa Cruz
New Cathedral of Coimbra
Old Cathedral of Coimbra
Church of São Gião

Évora District
Cathedral of Évora
Igreja do Espírito Santo
Igreja de Nossa Senhora da Boa Fé
Igreja dos Lóios
Church of Nossa Senhora da Graça
Igreja Matriz de Pavia
Igreja de São Francisco (Estremoz)
Igreja de São Francisco (Évora)
Igreja de São Mamede
Igreja de São Tiago
Igreja Matriz de Viana do Alentejo

Faro District

Cathedral of Faro
Hermitage of Our Lady of Guadalupe
Igreja da Misericórdia de Tavira
Igreja de Santa Maria do Castelo
Igreja de Santo António
Igreja de São Sebastião
Church of Nossa Senhora da Encarnação
Church of Nossa Senhora da Luz
Church of São Lourenço
Church of São Tiago
Silves Cathedral
Igreja Matriz de Estoi
Igreja de Nossa Senhora da Esperança

Guarda District

Leiria District
Church of Nossa Senhora da Nazaré
Igreja da Exaltação de Santa Cruz
Igreja de Nossa Senhora do Pópulo
Igreja de São Gião
Igreja de São João Baptista
Igreja de São Leonardo
Igreja de São Pedro
Igreja do Convento do Louriçal
Church of the Santíssima Trindade

Lisbon District
Convent of the Capuchos
Igreja da Penha Longa
Igreja da Póvoa de Santo Adrião
Igreja de Santa Maria (Loures)
Igreja de Santa Maria (Sintra)
Igreja de Santa Maria do Castelo
Igreja de Santo André
Igreja de São Quintino
Igreja do Convento Santo António da Lourinhã
Jerónimos Monastery
Monastery of São Dinis de Odivelas
Palace of Mafra

Lisbon
Church of Santa Engrácia
Estrela Basilica
Igreja da Madalena
Igreja da Madre de Deus
Igreja da Memória
Igreja de Chelas
Igreja de Nossa Senhora da Luz
Igreja de Santa Luzia
Igreja de Santo Estêvão
Igreja de São Domingos
Igreja de São Roque
Igreja do Menino Deus
Lisbon Cathedral
Monastery of São Vicente de Fora
Church of Nossa Senhora da Conceição Velha
Santo António Church
St Andrew's Church
St. George's Church

Madeira

 Cathedral of Funchal (Sé Catedral)
 Igreja de São João Evangelista (Colégio church)
 Igreja de São Pedro
 Convento de Santa Clara
 Capela das Almas Pobres
 Igreja do Carmo
 Holy Trinity Church (English church)
 Igreja de Santa Maria Maior (Santiago Menor Church or Igreja de Socorro)
 Capela do Corpo Santo
 Capela da Boa Viagem
 Igreja de Nossa Senhora do Monte
 Igreja Paroquial de Machico
 Capela dos Milagres
 Capela de São Vicente
 Capela de Nossa Senhora da Piedade
 Igreja de Santo António
 Igreja de São Martinho
 Igreja da Nazaré

Portalegre District

Porto District

Church of Bom Pastor
Igreja de Nossa Senhora do Ó de Águas Santas
Igreja de Santa Clara
Igreja de Santa Maria de Airães
Igreja de Santo André
Igreja de São Cristóvão de Rio Mau
Igreja de São Gens de Boelhe
Igreja de São Gonçalo
Igreja de São Martinho de Cedofeita
Igreja de São Miguel de Entre-os-Rios
Igreja de São Pedro
Igreja de São Pedro de Ferreira
Igreja de São Pedro de Roriz
Igreja de São Vicente de Sousa
Igreja Matriz de Vila do Conde

Porto

Igreja Paroquial de San Nicolau 

Antiga Casa da Câmara
Church of Saint Ildefonso
Church of São Francisco
Church of São Martinho de Cedofeita
Clérigos Church
Igreja de São Bento da Vitória
Igreja dos Grilos
Porto Cathedral

Póvoa de Varzim

Coração de Jesus Basilica
Lapa Church
Matriz Church of Póvoa de Varzim
Monastery of Rates
Senhora das Dores Church

Santarém District
Church of Atalaia
Igreja da Graça
Igreja da Misericórdia de Santarém
Igreja de Santa Clara
Igreja de Santa Maria de Marvila
Igreja de São João Baptista
Igreja de São João de Alporão
Igreja de São Nicolau
Igreja do Santíssimo Milagre
Igreja e Convento de Nossa Senhora de Jesus do Sítio
Igreja Matriz da Golegã
Our Lady of the Assumption Cathedral
Church of Santa Maria do Olival

Setúbal District
Igreja de Santiago de Palmela
Igreja de São João Baptista
Igreja de São Julião
Igreja do antigo Mosteiro de Jesus
Igreja Matriz de Santiago do Cacém
Church of Porto Covo

Viana do Castelo District
Church of Fiães
Igreja de Bravães
Igreja de Longos Vales
Igreja de São Fins de Friestas
Igreja Matriz de Caminha
Longos Vales's Monastery
Church of the Misericórdia de Valadares
Church of Senhor do Socorro
Church of São Martinho
Church of São Pedro de Rubiães
Church of São Salvador de Paderne

Vila Real District

Viseu District
Igreja de Nossa Senhora da Conceição
Igreja de São Martinho de Mouros
Igreja de São Miguel
Igreja Matriz de Santa Marinha de Trevões
Viseu Cathedral

See also

History of Roman Catholicism in Portugal
List of cathedrals in Portugal
List of churches in Póvoa de Varzim
List of Roman Catholic dioceses in Portugal

 
Portugal